Good Humour is the fifth studio album by Australian singer-songwriter Stephen Cummings. The album was released in February 1991 and peaked at number 40 on the Australian ARIA Charts; becoming Cummings' first top 50 album.

Reception

David Messer from Rolling Stone Australia gave the album 3 1/2 out of 5 saying "[Cummings] has opted for a record that mixes commercial and contemporary sounds along with his trademark depression and introspection – one half is dance music, the other, ballads. "

Track listing

Charts

Release history

References 

1991 albums
Stephen Cummings albums
Polydor Records albums